Rasul Abduraim (born 12 December 1988 in Panfilov District, Kyrgyzstan) is a Kyrgyzstani taekwondo practitioner. At the 2008 Olympics, he competed in the men's featherweight competition but was knocked out by Daniel Manz.  He competed in the 80 kg event at the 2012 Summer Olympics and was eliminated in the preliminary round by Mauro Sarmiento. He is a Kyrgyzstani Uyghur.

References

External links
 
 

1988 births
Living people
Kyrgyzstani male taekwondo practitioners
Olympic taekwondo practitioners of Kyrgyzstan
Taekwondo practitioners at the 2008 Summer Olympics
Taekwondo practitioners at the 2012 Summer Olympics
People from Chüy Region
Taekwondo practitioners at the 2006 Asian Games
Asian Games competitors for Kyrgyzstan
21st-century Kyrgyzstani people